St. Mary’s High School SSC is a private Catholic junior secondary school for boys located in Mazgaon, Mumbai, in the state of Maharashtra, India. The Christian minority institution was founded by the Jesuits in 1864. In 1933, the Secondary School Certificate school split from the adjacent St. Mary's Anglo-Indian School ICSE, with separate buildings and staff. The school covers kindergarten, and grades one through ten.

History
St. Mary's High School lies across Nesbit Road from St. Anne's Church which was established in 1787. St. Mary's High School was founded next to the church to serve military orphans, and then opened to the Catholic populace in general.

See also

 List of Jesuit schools
 List of schools in Mumbai
 Violence against Christians in India

References  

Jesuit secondary schools in India
Boys' schools in India
Christian schools in Maharashtra
Private schools in Mumbai
High schools and secondary schools in Mumbai
Educational institutions established in 1864
1864 establishments in India